Artan Isa Latifi (born 5 April 1983) is a Kosovo Albanian professional football coach and former player who is the current goalkeeping coach of London Soccer School.

Club career

Drita and KEK
In 1996 Latifi began his career at Drita as a 13-year-old cadet and later joined the junior and senior team. In 2004, he was transferred to Football Superleague of Kosovo side KEK.

Hysi and Besiana
In 2006 Latifi joined Football Superleague of Kosovo side Hysi, where he stayed for three years. In 2009, he joined First Football League of Kosovo side Besiana, on a one-year contract.

Return to Drita
In 2010 Latifi returned to Football Superleague of Kosovo side Drita, where he became the squad captain.

Retirement
On 10 March 2017 Latifi announced the retirement via a status on their official Facebook account, that he would retire at the end of 2016–17 season with the reason being to spend time with his family.

References

External links

1983 births
Living people
People from Gjilan
Kosovo Albanians
Association football goalkeepers
Kosovan footballers
FC Drita players
KF KEK players
KF Hysi players
FK Besiana players
Football Superleague of Kosovo players